Marjorie Burns is a scholar of English literature, best known for her studies of J. R. R. Tolkien.

Biography 

Marjorie Jean Burns was born in 1940. She gained her PhD at the University of California, Berkeley.

She is an emeritus professor of English at Portland State University, having worked on the faculty there for over thirty years. She lectured on English literature and Tolkien, writing many papers on these topics. She married the geologist Scott Burns, also at Portland State University, and Don S. Wilner. She has four children.

She co-edited the J. R. R. Tolkien Encyclopedia, and contributed four articles to it on topics including Old Norse literature and the giant spider Shelob.

Reception 

C. W. Sullivan III, reviewing her 2005 book Perilous Realms for the Journal of Folklore Research, found it both praiseworthy and problematic. He liked Burns's discussion of the English prejudice against the Celts, and of Tolkien's dislike of frivolous post-Shakespeare fairies. He noted that many of the chapters were published as separate papers, so there was some repetition, and she had failed to note the Celtic origin of Sir Gawain. But she had written a "valuable window into Tolkien's sources" and the way he blended "Celtic enchantment and Norse vitality", and the book was accessible to scholars and the public alike. 

Kathryn Stelmach, reviewing the book for Comitatus, found her exploration of Norse "more compelling" than her "overly simplified" approach to the "Celtic" identity and the use of unreliable sources.

Books 

 2005 Perilous Realms: Celtic and Norse in Tolkien’s Middle-earth (ed.), University of Toronto Press.
 2007 On Tolkien: Interviews, Reminiscences, and Other Essays (ed., with Douglas A. Anderson), Houghton Mifflin.

References

External links 

 

Tolkien studies
1940 births
Portland State University faculty
University of California, Berkeley alumni
Living people